Elaine Miles is an American actress known for her role as Marilyn Whirlwind in the television series Northern Exposure.

Biography
Elaine Miles was born in Pendleton, Oregon, of Cayuse/Nez Perce ancestry, and lived to the age of three on the Umatilla Indian Reservation in eastern Oregon.  Her family then moved to Renton, Washington, where her father was a Boeing machinist. She learned many of the traditional skills in her youth—storytelling, beading, pottery and weaving—and is a prize-winning traditional dancer.

Career
Miles was offered the role of Marilyn Whirlwind when she was spotted in the waiting room at an audition. This came as a surprise as she had not come with any intent to audition—she was only there to give her mother, Armenia Miles, a ride. She had no previous acting experience. She gained respect in the American Indian community, not only for portraying a Tlingit woman, but for her efforts to make sure the character was a culturally  accurate representation. Miles was named Native American Woman of the Year in 1993, and America's Celebrity Indian of the Year in 1995.

In 1995, Miles was nominated for a Screen Actors Guild Award as part of the Northern Exposure cast in the category, Outstanding Performance by an Ensemble in a Comedy Series.

Since Northern Exposure, Miles has done tours with her dancing and stand-up comedy, has emceed at numerous Pow-wows, and had roles in independent films such as Smoke Signals, Skins and The Business of Fancydancing. With fellow comedian Drew LaCapa (Apache), she has made an exercise video ("RezRobics") addressing diabetes rates among Native Americans. The video mixes pow wow dancing, martial arts and aerobics moves with nutritional advice. In contrast to the usual FBI warning, the creators encourage people to copy the video freely and distribute it among friends and relatives in Indian Country.

Filmography

References

External links
 
 Interview with Elaine Miles
 RezRobics Youtube Channel

Living people
American film actresses
American television actresses
People from Pendleton, Oregon
Native American actresses
Nez Perce people
Actresses from Oregon
20th-century American actresses
21st-century American actresses
Cayuse people
Year of birth missing (living people)
Native American people from Oregon
20th-century Native American women
20th-century Native Americans
21st-century Native American women
21st-century Native Americans